The Ambassador from Israel to Australia is Israel's foremost diplomatic representative in Australia.

List of ambassadors
Amir Maimon 2022 -
Mark Sofer 2017 - 2020
Shmuel Ben-Shmuel 2013 - 2017
Yuval Rotem 2007 - 2013
Irit Lillian, Acting Ambassador
Naftali Tamir 2005 - 2007 
Gabby Levy 1999 - 2004
Shmuel Moyal 1995 - 1999
Yehuda Avner 1992 - 1995
Yissakhar Ben-Yaakov 1983 - 1987
Avraham Kidron 1979 - 1982
Michael Elizur1974 - 1979
Moshe Erell 1970 - 1974
Simcha Pratt 1967 - 1970
David Tesher 1956 - 1957
Moshe Yuval 1958 - 1963
Minister Mordekhai Nurock 1953 - 1958
Minister Joseph Ivor Linton 1950 - 1952

Consulate (Sydney)
Consul General Ephraim Ben-Matityahu 1999 - 2003
Consul General Mordechai Yedid 1994 - 1998 
Consul General Raphael Goren 1990 - 1994
Consul General Zvi Gabay 1986 - 1990
Consul General David Marmor 1969 - 1973
Consul General Nahum Astar 1961 - 1964

References

Australia
Israel